Ignacio Fontes García-Balibrea (born 22 June 1998 in Granada) is a Spanish athlete. He specializes in middle-distances and has represented Spain in numerous events, including age group competitions and cross.country championships. He debuted at absolute level competition at the 2021 European Athletics Indoor Championships in Toruń, Poland.

Personal bests

Outdoor
800 metres: 1:46.79 (Barcelona 2019)
1500 metres: 3:33.27 (Stockholm 2021)
Mile: 3:54.38 (Eugene 2022)
10km: 28:57 (Madrid 2021)
Indoor
800 metres: 1:49.19 (Antequera 2017)
1500 metres: 3:36.89 (Liévin 2021)
3000 metres: 7:50.33 (Valencia 2021)

Competition record

References

External links
 
 
 
 

1998 births
Living people
Spanish male middle-distance runners
Sportspeople from Granada
Athletes (track and field) at the 2018 Mediterranean Games
Mediterranean Games competitors for Spain
Athletes (track and field) at the 2020 Summer Olympics
Olympic athletes of Spain